Amanda E. Batten (born 1979) is an American politician and member of the Republican Party. In 2019 she was elected to the Virginia House of Delegates. She represents the 96th district, comprising parts of James City County and York County.

Career

Batten spent about ten years working as a legislative aide in the Virginia General Assembly. She worked for state senator Tommy Norment and state delegate Brenda Pogge. She was also employed as a fundraising manager for the Medical Society of Virginia.

In March 2019, Pogge announced her retirement from the House of Delegates, and endorsed Batten as her replacement. Batten defeated former delegate Melanie Rapp Beale in the June primary by a 62-38 margin. Batten's top campaign issues were workforce development and ending a regional sales tax on Virginia's Historic Triangle. In the November general election, Batten defeated pediatrician Mark Downey by a 52-46 margin.

References

External links
Amanda Batten at the Virginia Public Access Project

1979 births
Living people
Politicians from Washington, D.C.
People from James City County, Virginia
Republican Party members of the Virginia House of Delegates
Women state legislators in Virginia
21st-century American politicians
21st-century American women politicians